NRL on Fox was an Australian sports talk show that deals with the issues in the National Rugby League.  It aired on Fox Sports Australia, Wednesday nights.  In 2012 it was announced that the show would have a new panel with Matthew Johns, Mark Geyer and Warren Smith.

Hosts

Presenters
 Warren Smith (2012)
 Matthew Johns (2012)
 Mark Geyer (2012)

Former Presenters
 Ryan Phelan
 Wendell Sailor
 Gary Freeman (rugby league)
 Wayne Pearce
 Laurie Daley

See also

 List of Australian television series
 List of longest-running Australian television series

References

External links

Fox Sports (Australian TV network) original programming
2009 Australian television series debuts
2012 Australian television series endings
Australian sports television series
Rugby league television shows
English-language television shows